In quantum mechanics, perturbation theory is a set of approximation schemes directly related to mathematical perturbation for describing a complicated quantum system in terms of a simpler one. The idea is to start with a simple system for which a mathematical solution is known, and add an additional "perturbing" Hamiltonian representing a weak disturbance to the system. If the disturbance is not too large, the various physical quantities associated with the perturbed system (e.g. its energy levels and eigenstates) can be expressed as "corrections" to those of the simple system. These corrections, being small compared to the size of the quantities themselves, can be calculated using approximate methods such as asymptotic series.  The complicated system can therefore be studied based on knowledge of the simpler one. In effect, it is describing a complicated unsolved system using a simple, solvable system.

Approximate Hamiltonians 
Perturbation theory is an important tool for describing real quantum systems, as it turns out to be very difficult to find exact solutions to the Schrödinger equation for Hamiltonians of even moderate complexity. The Hamiltonians to which we know exact solutions, such as the hydrogen atom, the quantum harmonic oscillator and the particle in a box, are too idealized to adequately describe most systems. Using perturbation theory, we can use the known solutions of these simple Hamiltonians to generate solutions for a range of more complicated systems.

Applying perturbation theory 
Perturbation theory is applicable if the problem at hand cannot be solved exactly, but can be formulated by adding a "small" term to the mathematical description of the exactly solvable problem.

For example, by adding a perturbative electric potential to the quantum mechanical model of the hydrogen atom, tiny shifts in the spectral lines of hydrogen caused by the presence of an electric field (the Stark effect) can be calculated. This is only approximate because the sum of a Coulomb potential with a linear potential is unstable (has no true bound states) although the tunneling time (decay rate) is very long. This instability shows up as a broadening of the energy spectrum lines, which perturbation theory fails to reproduce entirely.

The expressions produced by perturbation theory are not exact, but they can lead to accurate results as long as the expansion parameter, say , is very small. Typically, the results are expressed in terms of finite power series in  that seem to converge to the exact values when summed to higher order. After a certain order  however, the results become increasingly worse since the series are usually divergent (being asymptotic series). There exist ways to convert them into convergent series, which can be evaluated for large-expansion parameters, most efficiently by the variational method.  Even convergent perturbations can converge to the wrong answer and divergent perturbations expansions can sometimes give good results at lower order.

In the theory of quantum electrodynamics (QED), in which the electron–photon interaction is treated perturbatively, the calculation of the electron's magnetic moment has been found to agree with experiment to eleven decimal places. In QED and other quantum field theories, special calculation techniques known as Feynman diagrams are used to systematically sum the power series terms.

Limitations

Large perturbations 
Under some circumstances, perturbation theory is an invalid approach to take. This happens when the system we wish to describe cannot be described by a small perturbation imposed on some simple system. In quantum chromodynamics, for instance, the interaction of quarks with the gluon field cannot be treated perturbatively at low energies because the coupling constant (the expansion parameter) becomes too large, violating the requirement that corrections must be small.

Non-adiabatic states 
Perturbation theory also fails to describe states that are not generated adiabatically from the "free model", including bound states and various collective phenomena such as solitons. Imagine, for example, that we have a system of free (i.e. non-interacting) particles, to which an attractive interaction is introduced. Depending on the form of the interaction, this may create an entirely new set of eigenstates corresponding to groups of particles bound to one another. An example of this phenomenon may be found in conventional superconductivity, in which the phonon-mediated attraction between conduction electrons leads to the formation of correlated electron pairs known as Cooper pairs. When faced with such systems, one usually turns to other approximation schemes, such as the variational method and the WKB approximation. This is because there is no analogue of a bound particle in the unperturbed model and the energy of a soliton typically goes as the inverse of the expansion parameter. Perturbation theory can only detect solutions "close" to the unperturbed solution, even if there are other solutions for which the perturbative expansion is not valid.

Difficult computations 
The problem of non-perturbative systems has been somewhat alleviated by the advent of modern computers. It has become practical to obtain numerical non-perturbative solutions for certain problems, using methods such as density functional theory. These advances have been of particular benefit to the field of quantum chemistry. Computers have also been used to carry out perturbation theory calculations to extraordinarily high levels of precision, which has proven important in particle physics for generating theoretical results that can be compared with experiment.

Time-independent perturbation theory 
Time-independent perturbation theory is one of two categories of perturbation theory, the other being time-dependent perturbation (see next section). In time-independent perturbation theory, the perturbation Hamiltonian is static (i.e., possesses no time dependence). Time-independent perturbation theory was presented by Erwin Schrödinger in a 1926 paper, shortly after he produced his theories in wave mechanics. In this paper Schrödinger referred to earlier work of Lord Rayleigh, who investigated harmonic vibrations of a string perturbed by small inhomogeneities. This is why this perturbation theory is often referred to as Rayleigh–Schrödinger perturbation theory.

First order corrections 
The process begins with an unperturbed Hamiltonian , which is assumed to have no time dependence. It has known energy levels and eigenstates, arising from the time-independent Schrödinger equation:

For simplicity, it is assumed that the energies are discrete. The  superscripts denote that these quantities are associated with the unperturbed system. Note the use of bra–ket notation.

A perturbation is then introduced to the Hamiltonian. Let  be a Hamiltonian representing a weak physical disturbance, such as a potential energy produced by an external field. Thus,  is formally a Hermitian operator. Let  be a dimensionless parameter that can take on values ranging continuously from 0 (no perturbation) to 1 (the full perturbation). The perturbed Hamiltonian is:

The energy levels and eigenstates of the perturbed Hamiltonian are again given by the time-independent Schrödinger equation,

where

When , these reduce to the unperturbed values, which are the first term in each series. Since the perturbation is weak, the energy levels and eigenstates should not deviate too much from their unperturbed values, and the terms should rapidly become smaller as the order is increased.

Substituting the power series expansion into the Schrödinger equation produces:

Expanding this equation and comparing coefficients of each power of  results in an infinite series of simultaneous equations. The zeroth-order equation is simply the Schrödinger equation for the unperturbed system,

The first-order equation is

(Recall, the unperturbed Hamiltonian is Hermitian). This leads to the first-order energy shift,

This is simply the expectation value of the perturbation Hamiltonian while the system is in the unperturbed eigenstate.

This result can be interpreted in the following way: supposing that the perturbation is applied, but the system is kept in the quantum state , which is a valid quantum state though no longer an energy eigenstate. These further shifts are given by the second and higher order corrections to the energy.

Before corrections to the energy eigenstate are computed, the issue of normalization must be addressed. Supposing that

but perturbation theory also assumes that .

Since the overall phase is not determined in quantum mechanics, without loss of generality, in time-independent theory it can be assumed that  is purely real. Therefore,

leading to

Then by using the resolution of the identity:

The first-order equation may thus be expressed as

The above  also gives us the component of the first-order correction along .

Thus, in total, the result is,

The first-order change in the -th energy eigenket has a contribution from each of the energy eigenstates . The expression is singular if any of these states have the same energy as state , which is why it was assumed that there is no degeneracy. The above formula for the perturbed eigenstates also implies that the perturbation theory can be legitimately used only when the absolute magnitude of the matrix elements of the perturbation is small compared with the corresponding differences in the unperturbed energy levels, i.e.,

Second-order and higher-order corrections 
We can find the higher-order deviations by a similar procedure, though the calculations become quite tedious with our current formulation. Our normalization prescription gives that

Up to second order, the expressions for the energies and (normalized) eigenstates are:

If an intermediate normalization is taken (it means, if we require that ), we obtain the same expression for the second-order correction to the wave function, except for the last term.

Extending the process further, the third-order energy correction can be shown to be 

It is possible to relate the k-th order correction to the energy En to the k-point connected correlation function of the perturbation V in the state . For , one has to consider the inverse Laplace transform  of the two-point correlator:

where  is the perturbing operator V in the interaction picture, evolving in Euclidean time. Then

Similar formulas exist to all orders in perturbation theory, allowing one to express  in terms of the inverse Laplace transform  of the connected correlation function

To be precise, if we write

then the k-th order energy shift is given by

Effects of degeneracy 
Suppose that two or more energy eigenstates of the unperturbed Hamiltonian are degenerate. The first-order energy shift is not well defined, since there is no unique way to choose a basis of eigenstates for the unperturbed system. The various eigenstates for a given energy will perturb with different energies, or may well possess no continuous family of perturbations at all.

This is manifested in the calculation of the perturbed eigenstate via the fact that the operator

does not have a well-defined inverse.

Let  denote the subspace spanned by these degenerate eigenstates. Typically, the eigenvalues will split, and the eigenspaces will become simple (one-dimensional), or at least  of smaller dimension than D.

The  successful perturbations will not be "small" relative to a poorly chosen basis of D. Instead, we consider the perturbation "small" if the new eigenstate is close to the subspace .

For the first-order perturbation, we need solve the perturbed Hamiltonian restricted to the degenerate subspace ,

simultaneously for all the degenerate eigenstates, where  are first-order corrections to the degenerate energy levels, and "small" is a  vector of  orthogonal to D. This  amounts  to diagonalizing the matrix 

This procedure is approximate, since we neglected states outside the  subspace ("small"). The splitting of degenerate energies  is generally observed. Although the splitting may be small,  compared to the range of energies found in the system, it is crucial in understanding certain details, such as spectral lines in Electron Spin Resonance experiments.

Higher-order corrections due to other eigenstates outside   can be found in the same way as for the non-degenerate case,

The operator on the left-hand side is not singular when applied to eigenstates outside , so we can write

Near-degenerate states should also be treated similarly,  when the original Hamiltonian splits  aren't   larger than the perturbation in the near-degenerate subspace.  An application is found in the nearly free electron model, where near-degeneracy, treated properly, gives rise to an energy gap even for small perturbations. Other eigenstates will only shift the absolute energy of all near-degenerate states simultaneously.

Degeneracy lifted to first order 

Let us consider degenerate energy eigenstates and a perturbation that completely lifts the degeneracy to first order of correction.

The perturbed Hamiltonian is denoted as

Let us focus on the degeneracy of the -th unperturbed energy . The eventual degeneracy among the other states with  does not change our arguments. All states  with various values of  share the same energy  when there is no perturbation, i.e., when .

We assume that the basis vectors  in the degenerate subspace are chosen such that the matrix elements  are diagonal. Assuming also that the degeneracy is completely lifted to the first order, i.e. that  if , we have the following formulae for the energy correction to the second order in 

and for the state correction to the first order in 

Notice that here the first order correction to the state is orthogonal to the unperturbed state,

Generalization to multi-parameter case 
The generalization of time-independent perturbation theory to the case where there are multiple small parameters  in place of λ can be formulated more systematically using the language of differential geometry, which basically defines the derivatives of the quantum states and calculates the perturbative corrections by taking derivatives iteratively at the unperturbed point.

Hamiltonian and force operator 
From the differential geometric point of view, a parameterized Hamiltonian is considered as a function defined on the parameter manifold that maps each particular set of parameters  to an Hermitian operator  that acts on the Hilbert space. The parameters here can be external field, interaction strength, or driving parameters in the quantum phase transition. Let  and  be the -th eigenenergy and eigenstate of  respectively. In the language of differential geometry, the states  form a vector bundle over the parameter manifold, on which derivatives of these states can be defined.

Without loss of generality, the coordinate system can be shifted, such that the reference point  is set to be the origin. The following linearly parameterized Hamiltonian is frequently used

If the parameters  are considered as generalized coordinates, then  should be identified as the generalized force operators related to those coordinates. Different indices  label the different forces along different directions in the parameter manifold. For example, if  denotes the external magnetic field in the -direction, then  should be the magnetization in the same direction.

Perturbation theory as power series expansion 
The validity of perturbation theory lies on the adiabatic assumption, which assumes the eigenenergies and eigenstates of the Hamiltonian are smooth functions of parameters such that their values in the vicinity region can be calculated in power series (like Taylor expansion) of the parameters:

When applying to the state , it should be understood as the covariant derivative if the vector bundle is equipped with non-vanishing connection. This convention will be adopted throughout this subsection, that all functions without the parameter dependence explicitly stated are assumed to be evaluated at the origin. The power series may converge slowly or even not converge when the energy levels are close to each other. The adiabatic assumption breaks down when there is energy level degeneracy, and hence the perturbation theory is not applicable in that case.

Hellmann–Feynman theorems 
The above power series expansion can be readily evaluated if there is a systematic approach to calculate the derivates to any order. Using the chain rule, the derivatives can be broken down to the single derivative on either the energy or the state. The Hellmann–Feynman theorems are used to calculate these single derivatives. The first Hellmann–Feynman theorem gives the derivative of the energy,

The second Hellmann–Feynman theorem gives the derivative of the state (resolved by the complete basis with m ≠ n),

For the linearly parameterized Hamiltonian,  simply stands for the generalized force operator .

The theorems can be simply derived by applying the differential operator  to both sides of the Schrödinger equation  which reads

Then overlap with the state  from left and make use of the Schrödinger equation  again,

The first case will lead to the first theorem and the second case to the second theorem, which can be shown immediately by rearranging the terms. With the differential rules given by the Hellmann–Feynman theorems, the perturbative correction to the energies and states can be calculated systematically.

Correction of energy and state 
To the second order, the energy correction reads

where  denotes the real part function.
The first order derivative  is given by the first Hellmann–Feynman theorem directly. To obtain the second order derivative , simply applying the differential operator  to the result of the first order derivative , which reads

Note that for linearly parameterized Hamiltonian, there is no second derivative  on the operator level. Resolve the derivative of state by inserting the complete set of basis,

then all parts can be calculated using the Hellmann–Feynman theorems. In terms of Lie derivatives,  according to the definition of the connection for the vector bundle. Therefore, the case  can be excluded from the summation, which avoids the singularity of the energy denominator. The same procedure can be carried on for higher order derivatives, from which higher order corrections are obtained.

The same computational scheme is applicable for the correction of states. The result to the second order is as follows

Both energy derivatives and state derivatives will be involved in deduction. Whenever a state derivative is encountered, resolve it by inserting the complete set of basis, then the Hellmann-Feynman theorem is applicable. Because differentiation can be calculated systematically, the series expansion approach to the perturbative corrections can be coded on computers with symbolic processing software like Mathematica.

Effective Hamiltonian 
Let  be the Hamiltonian completely restricted either in the low-energy subspace  or in the high-energy subspace , such that there is no matrix element in  connecting the low- and the high-energy subspaces, i.e.  if . Let  be the coupling terms connecting the subspaces. Then when the high energy degrees of freedoms are integrated out, the effective Hamiltonian in the low energy subspace reads

Here  are restricted in the low energy subspace.

In a formal way it is possible to define an effective Hamiltonian that gives exactly the low-lying energy states and wavefunctions. In practice, some kind of approximation (perturbation theory) is generally required.

Time-dependent perturbation theory

Method of variation of constants 
Time-dependent perturbation theory, developed by Paul Dirac, studies the effect of a time-dependent perturbation  applied to a time-independent Hamiltonian 0.

Since the perturbed Hamiltonian is time-dependent, so are its energy levels and eigenstates. Thus, the goals of time-dependent perturbation theory are slightly different from time-independent perturbation theory.  One is interested in the following quantities:
 The time-dependent expectation value of some observable , for a given initial state.
 The time-dependent expansion coefficients (w.r.t. a given time-dependent state) of those basis states that are energy eigenkets (eigenvectors) in the unperturbed system.

The first quantity is important because it gives rise to the classical result of an   measurement performed on a macroscopic number of copies of the perturbed system. For example, we could take   to be the displacement in the -direction of the electron in a hydrogen atom, in which case the expected value, when multiplied by an appropriate coefficient, gives the time-dependent dielectric polarization of a hydrogen gas. With an appropriate choice of perturbation (i.e. an oscillating electric potential), this allows one to calculate the AC permittivity of the gas.

The second quantity looks at the time-dependent probability of occupation for each eigenstate. This is particularly useful in laser physics, where one is interested in the populations of different atomic states in a gas when a time-dependent electric field is applied. These probabilities are also useful for calculating the "quantum broadening" of spectral lines (see line broadening) and particle decay in particle physics and nuclear physics.

We will briefly examine the method behind Dirac's formulation of time-dependent perturbation theory. Choose an energy basis  for the unperturbed system. (We drop the (0) superscripts for the eigenstates, because it is not useful to speak of energy levels and eigenstates for the perturbed system.)

If the unperturbed system is an eigenstate (of the Hamiltonian)  at time  = 0, its state at subsequent times varies only by a phase (in the Schrödinger picture, where state vectors evolve in time and operators are constant),

Now, introduce a time-dependent perturbing Hamiltonian . The Hamiltonian of the perturbed system is

Let  denote the quantum state of the perturbed system at time . It obeys the time-dependent Schrödinger equation,

The quantum state at each instant can be expressed as a linear combination of the complete eigenbasis of :

We have explicitly extracted the exponential phase factors  on the right hand side. This is only a matter of convention, and may be done without loss of generality. The reason we go to this trouble is that when the system starts in the state  and no perturbation is present, the amplitudes have the convenient property that, for all ,
 = 1 and   = 0 if .

The square of the absolute amplitude   is the probability that the system is in state   at time  , since

Plugging into the Schrödinger equation and using the fact that ∂/∂t acts by a product rule, one obtains

The matrix elements of   play a similar role as in time-independent perturbation theory, being proportional to the rate at which amplitudes are shifted between states. Note, however, that the direction of the shift is modified by the exponential phase factor. Over times much longer than the energy difference , the phase winds around 0 several times. ( E.g., such oscillations are useful for managing radiative transitions in a laser.)

Up to this point, we have made no approximations, so this set of differential equations is exact. By supplying appropriate initial values  , we could in principle find an exact (i.e., non-perturbative) solution. This is easily done when there are only two energy levels ( = 1, 2), and this solution is useful for modelling systems like the ammonia molecule.

However, exact solutions are difficult to find when there are many energy levels, and one instead looks for perturbative solutions.  These may be obtained by expressing the equations in an integral form,

Repeatedly substituting this expression for  back into right hand side, yields an iterative solution,

where, for example, the first-order term is

To the same approximation, the summation in the above expression can be removed since in the unperturbed state  so that we have

Several further results follow from this, such as Fermi's golden rule, which relates the rate of transitions between quantum states to the density of states at particular energies; or the Dyson series, obtained by applying the iterative method to the time evolution operator, which is one of the starting points for the method of Feynman diagrams.

Method of Dyson series 
Time-dependent perturbations can be reorganized through the technique of the Dyson series. The Schrödinger equation

has the formal solution

where  is the time ordering operator,

Thus, the exponential represents the following Dyson series,

Note that in the second term, the 1/2! factor exactly cancels the double contribution due to the time-ordering operator, etc.

Consider the following perturbation problem

assuming that the parameter  is small and that  the problem  has been solved.

Perform the following unitary transformation to the interaction picture (or Dirac picture),

Consequently, the Schrödinger equation  simplifies to

so it is solved through the above Dyson series,

as a perturbation series with small .

Thus, the system, initially in the unperturbed state ,  by dint of the perturbation can go into the state . The corresponding transition probability amplitude to first order is

as detailed in the previous section——while the corresponding transition probability to a continuum is  furnished by Fermi's golden rule.

As an aside, note that time-independent perturbation theory is also organized inside this time-dependent perturbation theory Dyson series. To see this, write the unitary evolution operator, obtained from the above Dyson series, as

and take the perturbation  to be time-independent.

Using the identity resolution

It is evident that, at second order,  one must sum on all the intermediate states. Assume  and the asymptotic limit of larger times. This means that, at each contribution of the perturbation series, one has  to add a multiplicative factor  in the integrands for  arbitrarily small. Thus the limit  gives back the final state of the system by eliminating all oscillating terms, but keeping the secular ones.  The integrals are thus computable, and, separating the diagonal terms from the others yields

where the time secular series yields the eigenvalues of the perturbed problem specified above, recursively; whereas the remaining time-constant part yields the corrections to the stationary eigenfunctions also given above (.)

The unitary evolution operator is applicable to  arbitrary eigenstates of the unperturbed problem and, in this case, yields a secular series that holds at small times.

Strong perturbation theory 
In a similar way as for small perturbations, it is possible to develop a strong perturbation theory. Consider as usual the Schrödinger equation

and we consider the question if a dual Dyson series exists that applies in the limit of a perturbation increasingly large. This question can be answered in an affirmative way  and the series is the well-known adiabatic series. This approach is quite general and can be shown in the following way. Consider the perturbation problem

being . Our aim is to find a solution in the form

but a direct substitution into the above equation fails to produce useful results. This situation can be adjusted making a rescaling of the time variable as  producing the following meaningful equations

that can be solved once we know the solution of the leading order equation. But we know that in this case we can use the adiabatic approximation. When  does not depend on time one gets the Wigner-Kirkwood series that is often used in statistical mechanics. Indeed, in this case we introduce the unitary transformation

that defines a free picture as we are trying to eliminate the interaction term. Now, in dual way with respect to the small perturbations, we have to solve the Schrödinger equation

and we see that the expansion parameter  appears only into the exponential and so, the corresponding Dyson series, a dual Dyson series, is meaningful at large s and is

After the rescaling in time  we can see that this is indeed a series in  justifying in this way the name of dual Dyson series. This is called duality principle in perturbation theory. The choice  yields, as already said, a Wigner-Kirkwood series that is a gradient expansion. The Wigner-Kirkwood series is a semiclassical series with eigenvalues given exactly as for WKB approximation.

Examples

Example of first-order perturbation theory – ground-state energy of the quartic oscillator 
Consider the quantum harmonic oscillator with the quartic potential perturbation and the Hamiltonian

 

The ground state of the harmonic oscillator is

 

(), and the energy of unperturbed ground state is

 

Using the first-order correction formula, we get

 

or

Example of first- and second-order perturbation theory – quantum pendulum 
Consider the quantum-mathematical pendulum with the Hamiltonian

 

with the potential energy  taken as the perturbation i.e.

 

The unperturbed normalized quantum wave functions are those of the rigid rotor and are given by

 

and the energies

 

The first-order energy correction to the rotor due to the potential energy is

 

Using the formula for the second-order correction, one gets

 

or

 

or

Potential energy as a perturbation
When the unperturbed state is a free motion of a particle with kinetic energy , the solution of the Schrödinger equation

corresponds to plane waves with wavenumber . If there is a weak potential energy  present in the space, in the first approximation, the perturbed state is described by the equation

whose particular integral is

where . In the two-dimensional case, the solution is

In the one-dimensional case, the solution is

where .

Applications 
 Rabi cycle
 Fermi's golden rule
 Muon spin spectroscopy
 Perturbed angular correlation

References

External links 

  (lecture by Barton Zwiebach)
 

 
Mathematical physics